Tiaan Fourie (born 22 April 2002) is a South African rugby union player for the  in the Currie Cup. His regular position is scrum-half.

Fourie was named in the  squad for the 2021 Currie Cup Premier Division.

References

South African rugby union players
2002 births
Living people
Rugby union scrum-halves
Blue Bulls players